Roy Nibourette is a member of the National Assembly of Seychelles.  He is a member of the Seychelles People's Progressive Front, and was first elected to the Assembly in 2007.

External links
Member page on Assembly website

Year of birth missing (living people)
Living people
Members of the National Assembly (Seychelles)
People from La Rivière Anglaise
United Seychelles Party politicians